Siegbahn is a surname. Notable people with the surname include:

Bo Siegbahn (1915–2008), Swedish diplomat
Kai Siegbahn (1918–2007), Swedish physicist, Nobel Prize in 1981
Manne Siegbahn (1886–1978), Swedish physicist, Nobel Prize in 1924

See also
Siegbahn notation, spectroscopic notation for x-ray lines introduced by Manne Siegbahn
X unit, unit of length defined by Manne Siegbahn